Kuwaiti tea ("Shay al Kuwaiti") refers to several varieties of tea traditionally served in that country.

One is a sweet cinnamon tea. This tea is served with breakfast or during the traditional tea ceremony. The tea is created by putting water in a boiler together with cinnamon sticks and sugar. When the tea is ready, it is served with nuts, dried fruit, cookies or dates.

Another type of Kuwaiti tea is saffron and cardamom tea. This tea is usually served after lunch. It is a Kuwaiti tradition to offer a guest to a house a cup of tea or Arabic coffee.

See also
 Kuwaiti cuisine
 Arabic tea

References

 From the Lands of Figs and Olives: Over 300 Delicious and Unusual Recipes. 1997. Habeeb Salloum, James Peters.

Arab cuisine
Arabic drinks
Kuwaiti cuisine
Tea by country